Miguel Ángel García de la Herrán, best known as Miguel Herrán, is a Spanish actor. He is known for his lead roles in series Élite and Money Heist. In 2016, he won the Goya Award for Best New Actor for his role in the film Nothing in Return.

Career 
A chance encounter with actor and director Daniel Guzmán in the streets of Malaga led to Herrán auditioning for the role of Darío in the film Nothing in Return, which he won a Goya award for in 2016.

In 2017, he was cast as Aníbal Cortés (codename 'Río') in the Antena 3 series Money Heist, which was later picked up by Netflix. In 2018, he starred as Christian Varela in the Netflix original series Élite.

Herrán also acted in an advertisement for the Indian music streaming platform Gaana.

Filmography

Movies

Television

Accolades

References

External links

Living people
People from Málaga
Spanish male film actors
Male actors from Andalusia
Spanish male television actors
21st-century Spanish male actors
1996 births